Parliamentary elections were held in Southern Cameroons in March 1957. The Kamerun National Congress emerged as the largest party, winning six of the 13 seats in the House of Assembly.

Results

References

Southern Cameroons
Parliamentary
Elections in Cameroon
Election and referendum articles with incomplete results